"Write Your Story" is the lead single on American musician Francesca Battistelli's third studio album If We're Honest. It was released on January 3, 2014 to radio and commercially on January 14, 2014 by Word Entertainment and Fervent Records, and it was co-written by Battistelli, David Arthur Garcia, Ben Glover and produced by Ian Eskelin. In addition, Battistelli performed the song on Good Morning America on February 13, 2014. The song was nominated for Best Contemporary Christian Music Performance/Song at the 57th Annual Grammy Awards.

Charts

Weekly charts

Year-end charts

References 

2014 singles
Contemporary Christian songs
2014 songs
Songs written by Ben Glover
Song recordings produced by Ian Eskelin
Word Records singles
Songs written by David Garcia (musician)
Francesca Battistelli songs
Songs written by Francesca Battistelli